Hello Molly is an Australian women's clothing retailer that sells online. The company has headquarters in Sydney, Australia and offices in Los Angeles and Beijing.

History 
Hello Molly was co-founded in 2012 by Ena Hadziselimovic when she was a university student along with her business partner who chooses to remain anonymous. Catching the attention of young female shoppers, in their first financial year they sold $510,100, and growing to 5.3 million in 2014. The site drops over 100 new clothing releases every week, in attempts to reach a myriad of different styles and identities.

In July 2018 the company launched a new experimental marketing campaign. At 3 Sydney, Australia universities the company created stands where students could spin a wheel as a chance to win various prizes.

Hello Molly released its first swimwear line for the 2018/2019 season in November 2018 to expand the brand from its current 'party wear'.

In popular culture 
Hello Molly released its first TV commercial in May, 2018 during the show Love Island.

The brand has received publicity via several models, Emily Ratajkowski was seen wearing a Hello Molly dress in New York City and Jasmine Tookes was pictured wearing a Hello Molly dress on her Instagram. Actress Jenna Dewan was also spotted running errands in a Hello Molly dress.

Hello Molly was mentioned in a feature dubbed 'online shopping night cheat sheet' along with other retailers in Vogue Australia in April 2018. Similarly in June 2018 a Hello Molly jumpsuit was featured in a Glamour (magazine) article about wedding-guest attire.

References 

Australian companies established in 2012
Companies based in Sydney
Clothing retailers of Australia
Online retailers of Australia